Jim Levy is an American businessman who began his career as a music industry executive before he became the founding chief executive officer for Activision.

Activision was founded on giving their game designers a lot of recognition for their work. It is for this reason that he promoted his game designers like rock stars. Each game's instruction booklet would have a brief biography of the developer, as well as their autograph. He also was a driving force in the acquisition of Infocom. In 1986, he resigned his position, also at a time when games required more than one person to be involved in a game, therefore his style of recognition became less effective.

References

Activision
American technology chief executives
Tepper School of Business alumni
Living people
Year of birth missing (living people)
Game Developers Conference Pioneer Award recipients